Ada (minor planet designation: 523 Ada) is a minor planet orbiting the Sun. It was discovered January 29, 1904, by American astronomer Raymond S. Dugan at Heidelberg, Germany and was named after his friend Ada Helme. CCD images collected during the fall of 2004 at Oakley Observatory in Terre Haute, Indiana, were used to generate a lightcurve for the object, showing a rotation period of 10.03 ± 0.01 hours.

References

External links
 
 

Background asteroids
Ada
Ada
X-type asteroids (SMASS)
19040127